Rand's warbler (Randia pseudozosterops) is a species in the family Bernieridae. It is found only in Madagascar.

Its natural habitat is subtropical or tropical moist lowland forests. It is threatened by habitat loss.

References

Malagasy warblers
Rand's warbler
Rand's warbler
Rand's warbler
Taxonomy articles created by Polbot